Rijssen is a railway station located in Rijssen, Netherlands. The station was opened on 1 September 1888 and is located on the Deventer–Almelo railway. The train services are operated by Nederlandse Spoorwegen. From 1910 to 1935 there was a railway line that passed through Rijssen from Neede to Hellendoorn.

Train services

Bus services

External links
NS website 
Dutch Public Transport journey planner 

Railway stations in Overijssel
Railway stations opened in 1886
Rijssen-Holten